Area codes 310 and 424 are telephone area codes in the North American Numbering Plan (NANP) for the U.S. state of California.

Area code 310 was created in a split from area code 213 on November 2, 1991. On January 25, 1997, area code 310 was split, creating area code 562 for the southeast portion of Los Angeles County and a large portion of Orange County. Area code 424 was added to the remaining numbering plan area on July 26, 2006, in an overlay plan, the first in California.

Splits and overlay controversy
Area code 562 was originally intended as an overlay code for cellular and pager services for the existing 310 area. The overlay was planned for late 1995, and was expected to extended over the 213 and 818 areas the following year. However, the plan was changed to a split of 310, when the California Public Utilities Commission decided that an overlay would have disadvantaged subscribers of smaller companies in requiring ten-digit dialing.

The south and east portions of 310, roughly the Gateway Cities area of Los Angeles County from Long Beach to Whittier and parts of Orange County became area code 562 on January 25, 1997.

In lieu of executing an additional split, a new area code, 424, was implemented in the entire 310 region, first announced in early 1999. Previously, several proposals intended to split 310 at Imperial Highway, a major east–west thoroughfare that marks the southern boundary of Los Angeles International Airport. The South Bay below the boundary would have received area code 424. South Bay governments and businesses opposed such a move, since it would require costly changes to business cards, stationery, signage, and other business communications.

Announcement of the 424 overlay created an uproar in Los Angeles's politically powerful Westside community, in part because the change would necessitate dialing ten digits even when calling local numbers. Championed by Los Angeles Times columnist Robert Scheer in the paper's Santa Monica insert section, a protest movement arose in May 1999, focusing on the idea of telephone-number conservation. In a carry-over from the time of analog telephone systems, numbers were still assigned to telephone companies in blocks of 10,000, leading to a large portion of unused telephone numbers in each area code. Responding to the controversy, the California State Assembly passed the Consumer Area Code Relief Act of 1999 on September 9, 1999, and the 424 overlay was tabled.

Having been staved off nearly seven years, the 424 overlay was finally implemented on July 26, 2006, and new telephone numbers issued in the 310 area code may now begin with either 310 or 424. On December 31, 2005, customers began dialing 1 + area code + seven-digit number (cellphones can omit the "1") whenever a call is placed from the 310 area code. After July 26, 2006, customers were required to use the new dialing procedure for all calls.

Service area municipalities

Los Angeles County

Alondra Park
Athens
Avalon
Beverly Hills (small portion in the 323 area code)
Carson
Compton 
Culver City 
Del Aire
East Compton
El Segundo
Gardena
Hawthorne (small portion in the 323 area code)
Hermosa Beach
Inglewood (small portion in the 323 area code)
Lynwood
Ladera Heights (also in the 323 area code)
Lawndale
Lennox
Lomita
Los Angeles
Bel Air
Brentwood
Harbor City
Harbor Gateway (small portion in the 323 area code)
Pacific Palisades
Playa del Rey
Playa Vista
San Pedro
Venice
West Los Angeles
Westchester
Westwood
Wilmington
Lynwood (small portion in the 323 area code)
Malibu
Manhattan Beach
Marina del Rey
Palos Verdes Estates
Rancho Palos Verdes
Redondo Beach
Rolling Hills Estates
Rolling Hills
Santa Monica
South Gate (mostly in the 323 area code and small portion in the 562 area code)
Topanga (small portion in the 818 area code)
Torrance
West Athens (mostly in the 323 area code)
West Carson
West Compton
West Hollywood (also in the 323 area code)
Willowbrook (also in the 323 area code)

See also
List of California area codes
List of NANP area codes
North American Numbering Plan

References

External links

 310 Area Code Location, Time Zone, Numbers. araara.co.

310
310
Los Angeles County, California
Channel Islands of California
Santa Monica Mountains
South Bay, Los Angeles
Westside (Los Angeles County)
Telecommunications-related introductions in 1991
Telecommunications-related introductions in 2006